The Guangzhou–Hankou or Yuehan railway is a former railroad in China which once connected Guangzhou on the Pearl River in the south with Wuchang on the Yangtze River in the north. At the Yangtze, the railway carriages were ferried to Hankou, which then connected to the Beijing–Hankou railway.

The completion of the Wuhan Yangtze River Bridge in 1957 finally linked the two lines into a single contiguous railway and its former track now forms the southern leg of the Beijing–Guangzhou railway.

History 

In 1897, a concession for the Beijing–Hankou railway was awarded to a Belgian consortium backed by French financing. The British were then the dominant foreign power in China, and the Belgian concession would keep the important route out of British hands. To prevent the French from controlling the entire route between Beijing and Guangzhou, the Chinese government actively sought American involvement in the Guangzhou–Hankou railway.  A concession for the southern railway was awarded to the American China Development Company in 1898.

Construction on the project began in 1900, with the southern terminus on the east bank of the Pearl River. The  branch line to Sanshui ("Samshui") via Foshan ("Fatshan") was constructed westward from the west bank of the Pearl from 1902 to 1904.

A diplomatic crisis erupted when it was discovered that a Belgian consortium had purchased a controlling interest in the American China Development Company. This subverted the original intention of awarding different railway lines to different foreign powers. The American financier J. P. Morgan bought a large stake in the company in November 1904, but the concession was cancelled on November 19, 1904. Morgan demanded  in compensation but settled for  million, representing treble damages for the  already spent on the construction of the railway, plus  to redeem the concession.

The railway was completed in 1936.

See also
 Theodone C. Hu
 Guangzhou–Sanshui railway
 Rail transport & History of rail transport in China
 List of railways in China

References

Railway lines in China
Rail transport in Guangdong
Rail transport in Hubei
Rail transport in Hunan
Railway lines opened in 1936
1936 establishments in China